is a stratovolcano of the Northern Yatsugatake Volcanic Group in Koumi, Nagano Prefecture, Japan. This mountain is part of the Yatsugatake-Chūshin Kōgen Quasi-National Park.

Climbing route

There are several routes to reach to the top of Mount Nyū. One is from Shirokoma Pond, it takes one and half hours. Another major route is from Mount Naka.

Access 
 Shirokomaike-iriguchi Bus Stop of Chikuma Bus
 Mugikusa-toge Bus Stop of Chikuma Bus

Gallery

References

 Ministry of Environment of Japan (Japanese)
 Official Home Page of the Geographical Survey Institute in Japan (Japanese)

Mountains of Nagano Prefecture
Volcanoes of Nagano Prefecture